Deddie Davies (born Gillian Nancy Davies, 2 March 1938 – 21 December 2016) was a Welsh character actress.

Biography
Davies was born in Bridgend, Wales. She trained at RADA and is most familiar to television viewers for comedy roles in a host of series, including The Rag Trade, That's My Boy, Some Mothers Do 'Ave 'Em and Chance in a Million.

She appeared in non-comedic roles in series such as The Bill, Upstairs, Downstairs, The Forsyte Saga and Grange Hill. Her film roles include that of Nell Perks in The Railway Children (1970), and The Amazing Mr. Blunden (1972).

In her later life, Davies was concerned for issues facing the elderly. In May 2007 she had musical success as a member of superannuated pop group The Zimmers. Their cover version of "My Generation" reached number 26 in the UK Singles Chart. In 2008, Davies investigated the quality of life in elderly care facilities by posing as the aunt of a BBC reporter, being admitted to a rest home, and spending five days there. She recorded her experiences and treatment and concluded that life in many facilities was a "slow death", featuring inactivity, loneliness and minimal interpersonal interaction. Davies's research was reported on BBC Radio 4's Today programme.   
She became a trustee and recorded a video for UK registered charity Compassion in Care.

From 2012, she appeared as Marj Brennig in the British TV series Stella.

She died of ovarian cancer on 21 December 2016, aged 78.

Filmography

TV

Film

References

External links
 

1938 births
2016 deaths
People from Bridgend
Welsh television actresses
20th-century Welsh women singers
Alumni of RADA
20th-century British businesspeople